Dadan Island (Tatan, Taitan Island, Tae-tan/Taetan) (originally ) is an island in Lieyu Township, Kinmen County, Fujian Province, Republic of China (Taiwan). The island is in the Taiwan Strait, along the coast of Mainland China.

History

In March 1853, HMS Rattler struck a sunken rock at Amoy, China and was severely damaged. She was beached at Tae-tan (Dadan) for repairs.

Since 1949, Dadan Island has several times become the battlefront of conflicts between the People's Liberation Army and the Republic of China Armed Forces.

On July 26, 1950, ROC forces on the island, in total 298 soldiers, repulsed an attack (大擔島戰役) from a People's Liberation Army force of 700 soldiers that landed on the island.

In October 1951, Chiang Ching-kuo visited the island and gave the island its current name.

Chinese Nationalist spokesmen reported that Chinese Communists shelled Dadan and Erdan between June 26–28, 1957. At that time, Chinese Nationalist strength on the islands was around 1,100 men.

On May 9–10, 2002, President Chen Shui-bian visited Dadan (Tatan) and delivered remarks concerning Cross-Strait relations.

On 30 June 2014, the control of the island and surrounding islets was handed over from the Republic of China Armed Forces to the civilian under the Coast Guard Administration of Kinmen County Government.

From 26 July until 31 October 2018, the island was opened to the public on trial basis which attracted 3,000 people in total. On 1 March 2019, the island was officially opened for tourism. A maximum of 150 people can visit the island on a given day and sight-seers must apply for permission to visit ten days before their visit. Residents of Mainland China, Hong Kong and Macau are prohibited from visiting the island.

Geography
The northern and southern part of the island are more elevated than its central area, which contains a strip of sandy beach.

Dadan Island is the largest of a small group of islets which also includes Erdan Island, Sandan Island, Sidan Island, Wudan Island, Menghu Islet, etc. They sit astride the entrance into the Xiamen (Amoy) Harbor from the Taiwan Strait.

The islands of Wu Yu and Qing Yu in Gangwei, Longhai City, Zhangzhou, Fujian, China are located to the south of Dadan Island.

Sights

Dadan's Southern and Eastern lighthouses were constructed at the same time.  However, due to the August 23 ("823") Artillery barrage by the PLA, all that is left are their respective foundations.
There are two temples located on Dadan island.  One in the north and one in the south.
"Three Principles of the People Unite China" Slogan Wall is founded by General Zhao Wan-fu on the North of the island in August 1986, depositioned after Lieyu Massacre next year.
The Tomb of General Mingwei is the tomb of Liu Long-chang, Governor General of the Navy in the Early Qing Dynasty who resigned and retired to Dadan Island

See also
 Erdan Island
 List of islands of Taiwan

References

External links
 Former battleground island near China prepares to welcome tourists from Taiwan
 我們的島 第907集 揭開大膽島神秘面紗 (2017-05-22) ('Our Island (#907) Lifting the Veil of the Mysterious Dadan Island'), Public Television Service 

Landforms of Kinmen County
Lieyu Township
Islands of Fujian, Republic of China